Regaining Unconsciousness is an EP by NOFX, released prior to the release of The War on Errorism. Regaining Unconsciousness was the name of a song that appeared on The War on Errorism, although that song did not appear on this EP.

All tracks appeared on The War  on Errorism except for "Hardcore '84" and "Commercial,' which was a mock commercial for War on Errorism.

The lyrics to Regaining Unconsciousness show strong similarities to the poem First they came ... by Martin Niemöller, written in 1946 about the rise of Nazism.

Track listing

CD version
 "Medio-core"
 "Idiots Are Taking Over"
 "Franco Un-American"
 "Hardcore '84"
 "Commercial" (unlisted)

7" vinyl version

Side A
 "Idiots Are Taking Over"

Side B
 "Franco Un-American"
 "Hardcore '84"

Charts

References

External links

Regaining Unconsciousness at YouTube (streamed copy where licensed)

2003 EPs
NOFX EPs
Fat Wreck Chords EPs